Dictyotremella is a genus of fungi in the family Tremellaceae. The genus is monotypic, containing the single species Dictyotremella novoguineensis, found in Papua New Guinea.

References

External links

Tremellomycetes
Fungi of New Guinea
Monotypic Basidiomycota genera